Graham Reynolds may refer to:

Graham Reynolds (art historian) (1914–2013), English historian
Graham Reynolds (composer) (born 1971), American composer
Graham Reynolds (cricketer) (1937–2008), Welsh cricketer